Michał Ozga (born 23 June 2000) is a Polish professional footballer who plays as a centre-back or defensive midfielder for Jagiellonia Białystok.

References

External links

2000 births
Living people
Polish footballers
Association football defenders
Hutnik Nowa Huta players
Jagiellonia Białystok players
Wigry Suwałki players
Ekstraklasa players
I liga players
II liga players
Poland youth international footballers